Diascia transvitta is a moth of the family Noctuidae first described by Frederic Moore in 1887. It is found in Sri Lanka.

The male has finely fasciculate (bundled) antennae.

References

Moths of Asia
Moths described in 1887